Hoplias lacerdae is a predatory freshwater characin fish from South America. The are commonly known are trairão in Brazilian Portuguese.

The fish is named in honor of physician-anthropologist Jean Baptiste de Lacerda (1845-1915), the director of the National Museum of Rio Janeiro, because of his interest in the scientific explorations of the region.

Distribution
South America: Rio Ribeira de Iguape basin in São Paulo and Paraná states of Brazil.

Biology
Hoplias lacerdae is an ambush predator of other fish.

Description
They can grow up to 75 cm in length and the maximum published weight is 4.3 kg.

Taxonomy
Molecular studies show that this species is not closely related to Hoplias malabaricus.

References

Osvaldo T Oyakawa, George M T Mattox (2009), Revision of the Neotropical trahiras of the Hoplias lacerdae species-group (Ostariophysi: Characiformes: Erythrinidae) with descriptions of two new species Neotropical Ichthyology,Vol 7, pp 117–140

Fish of South America
Erythrinidae
Taxa named by Alípio de Miranda-Ribeiro
Fish described in 1908